Antony Berg (8 August 1880 – 18 April 1948) was a French bobsledder. He competed in the four-man event at the 1924 Winter Olympics. Berg earned a Military Cross for fighting in World War I, and in 1928, he became an Officier of the Legion of Honour.

References

External links
 

1880 births
1948 deaths
French male bobsledders
Olympic bobsledders of France
Bobsledders at the 1924 Winter Olympics
Place of birth missing
Officiers of the Légion d'honneur